The British International School Istanbul (BISI) is a private international primary and secondary school in Istanbul, Turkey, offering a modified English National Curriculum, IGCSE and the International Baccalaureate Diploma Programme. The school comprises two campuses: a city campus for preschool and primary students and a campus in Zekeriyaköy for preschool, primary, and secondary students. The school is a co-educational community. Students come from over 55 nationalities and are between the ages of 2½ to 18 years old. As a private international school, graduates often go on to gain university educations. Alum frequently enrol in higher education institutions in the UK and USA.

It has two campuses:
 BISI City Campus in Etiler, Beşiktaş, serving early years foundation stage and primary school. The current facility opened in January 2017
 Zekeriyakoy Campus in Zekeriyakoy, Sarıyer serves all educational stages from preschool through senior school/sixth form

History 

The British International School Istanbul has been in existence for twenty five years, but the current proprietor took over in 2000. BISI is a split site school with a City Campus in Etiler for Pre School and Primary and a Forest Campus in Zekeriyakoy which covers students aged 2½ to 18. Over the last few years the school has demonstrated growth and development and continues to do so. Student numbers have increased and the facilities and resources followed suit.

The Zekeriyakoy Campus was built and opened in 2006 in response to the growth in student numbers. In September 2017 the school expanded to include a new national school for children between the ages of 2 and 7 whose parents seek a Turkish education with an international flavour. It is anticipated that the new national school will grow year on year until it educates students up to Year 13.

General Information 

The British International School Istanbul is the leading private international School in Turkey, offering a modified English National Curriculum, IGCSE and the International Baccalaureate Diploma Programme.

It is the first and only school in Istanbul to simultaneously hold accredited school status with Council of International Schools, Council of British International Schools and Middle States Association Commission On Elementary and Secondary Schools.

References 

High schools in Istanbul
International Baccalaureate schools in Turkey
Private schools in Turkey
International schools in Istanbul